Hamilton Terrace is a wide, tree-lined residential thoroughfare in St John's Wood, London, England. It runs north to south from Carlton Hill to St. John's Wood Road, and is parallel to Maida Vale to the west.

The street was named after Charles Hamilton, a Harrow School governor.

The street is home to a variety of grand detached and semi-detached houses and mansion blocks. The listed Anglican church St Mark's, Hamilton Terrace is located at the intersection of Abercorn Place and Hamilton Terrace.

Notable residents

No.3  Michael Ayrton, English artist, lived at No. 3
No.8  Norman Kerr, physician remembered for his work in the British temperance movement, lived at No. 8 (formerly No. 1)
No.10 Henry Barnett, banker and politician, lived at No. 10. Sir Charles Mackerras, conductor and musicologist, lived at No. 10.
No.14  Philip Jones, English jazz trumpeter, lived at No. 14
No.17  Sir Joseph Bazalgette, English civil engineer, designer of the Victoria Embankment, lived at No. 17
No.20  Sir George Alexander Macfarren, English composer, lived at No. 20
No.20  William McMillan, Scottish sculptor, lived at No. 20
No.20  William Strang, Scottish artist, lived at No. 20
No.29  Nicholas Trübner, publisher, bookseller and linguist, lived at No. 29
No.29  Joseph Octave Delepierre, Belgian lawyer, archivist, diplomat, author and antiquary, died at No.29.
No.37  John Minton, and Keith Vaughan, English artists, shared a flat at No. 37
No.40  Honor Blackman, English actress
No.40  Kathleen Ferrier, English singer
No.63  Sir Arthur Wing Pinero, English dramatist, actor and theatre manager, lived at No. 63
No.65  Alan Wheatley, English actor, lived at No. 65
No.70  Thomas Hardy, English novelist, author of Far from the Madding Crowd, rented No.70, in 1893
No.93  Gerald Finzi, English composer, was born at No. 93
No.98  Brian Johnston, English cricket commentator and journalist, lived at No. 98
No.103  Joseph Hertz, Hungarian rabbi, Chief Rabbi in Britain from 1913 to 1946, lived at No. 103
No.135  Audrey Fildes, English actress, lived at No. 135
Henry Stacy Marks, English painter
Gerald Moore, English classical pianist

References

Streets in the City of Westminster
St John's Wood